Al-Kahf (The Cave) is the 18th chapter (sūrah) of the Quran with 110 verses (āyāt). Regarding the timing and contextual background of the revelation (asbāb al-nuzūl), it is an earlier "Meccan surah", which means it was revealed in Mecca, instead of Medina.

Summary
1 God praised for the gift of Quran
2 The Quran being a warning for the unbelievers and good tidings to the faithful
3 The reward for the believers who do good deeds will be an everlasting abode (Jannah)
4-5 The Quran is a warning to those who say God has begotten, and the ignorance of their sayings
6 Muhammad's grief for the disbelief of his people
7-8 Earth's adornment to be reduced to dust
9-22 The story of the companions of the cave
23-24 Muhammad is warned by Allah not to intend to do anything without saying "Insha-Allah" ("Allah willing" in Arabic).
25 The sleepers of the cave have slept 300 solar years and 309 lunar years
26 Times and seasons are in God's hands. Time is a creation of God and can be modified by Him.
27 None can change the Quran
28 The pious are the Prophet's guardians
29 Truth is from the Lord
30-31 Sufferings of the wicked contrasted with the rewards of the righteous
32-44 The parable of the two men
45 Life on earth likened to water from heaven
46 God's preference to humans' good deeds than their wealth and children
47  Mankind's assemblage on judgment-day
48-49 The manner of the judgment—the book of personal action delivered
50 Iblis's refusal to prostrate to Adam when Adam was created
51 The offspring of Satan, not present at the creation
52 Idol-worshippers deserted by their idols in the judgment
53 The wicked doomed to hellfire
54 Every similitude mentioned in the Quran
55 Men's rejection of the Quran through their disbelief
56 Prophets have been sent with threats and good news
57 The sin of apostasy
58 Allah's mercy and that He appointed a time for people's accountability and torment
59 Disbelief's destruction of former cities
60-65 Moses and Joshua visit Khidr
 66 Moses desires to be taught by Khidr
 66-69 Khidr, knowing Moses's inability to receive his wisdom, yields to his importunity
 71-77 He scuttles a boat, kills a boy, and rebuilds a collapsing wall
 78-82 Khidr refuses to communicate further with Moses on account of his protests against his conduct, but condescends to explain his conduct.
83-86  Dhu al Qarnain journeys to the setting sun which is located in a muddy pool
 87-88 He finds a people, whom he is permitted to treat as he will
 89-94 He travels east and north, where he finds an ignorant race, who plead his protection against Gog and Magog
 95-97 He builds a rampart against them
 98 Gog and Magog to be let loose before judgment-day
 99 All creatures being resurrected and gathered by the trumpet blow of Israfil.
100-108 The rewards and punishments of judgment-day
109 The ocean's insufficiency to write all the words of God with ink
110 Muhammad's morality and humanity

Exegesis

9-26 "Companions of the cave"
Verses 9–26 of the chapter retell the Christian folktale of the "companions of the cave". A few young believers lived in a time when they were tortured for their beliefs. Upon the guidance of God, they fled the city where believers were persecuted, together with their dog, and took refuge in a cave where they fell asleep. When they awoke they found that the people of the city had become believers.

27 No room for diversity in interpretation of the Quran

The commentary by Ozma Nasir Makarim Shirazi says, "There is no room for diversity to enter into His Words and Knowledge.  His Speech and His Knowledge is not like the speech and knowledge of human beings which, as a result of a new invention or information, has to be changed". Ibn Kathir says this verse means of the words in the Quran, "no one can alter them, distort them or misinterpret them."

32-45 The parable of the two men
In verses 32–44 the surah discusses a parable of two men, one of whom had been given blessings from God and the other poor. The rich one wronged his soul and started showing off with his wealth and noble lineage.

Verse 36 explains that The rich man also told his companion that he doubted the existence of Judgment Day.
At the end of the parable, God destroys what He had given the man.

Q18:45 Imam Musa al-Kadhim narrates in Kitab al-Kafi that Ali would bequeath his companions to view this world with the vision of an ascetic because it dislodges its residents. Ali provides them with the parable of a lush, green garden with scented dew that accumulates under the blades of grass but then gets separated from it in the morning, as Allah has said, 
"Set forth to them the similitude of the life of this world: it is like the rain which We send down from the skies: the earth's vegetation absorbs it, But soon it becomes dry stubble, which the winds do scatter: it is (only) Allah Who prevails over all things. Q18:45." He advises his companions to "look at this world and the numerous things which cause you to wonder, and the scarcity of things that benefit you."

60-82 Islamic view of Moses

The third main story within the chapter (verses 60–82) is that of Musa (Moses) traveling to gain knowledge from another servant of God who is never mentioned by name, in tafsir of ibn Kathir he is called Al-Khidr.

83-98 Dhul-Qarnayn

Finally, the surah mentions in verses 83–98 a man who traveled a great deal and reached the east and the west of the earth – namely, Dhul-Qarnayn. The Qur'an repeats the Syrian legend of a great king who helps a tribe of people build a massive wall of iron between two mountains. It goes on to say that this wall will be only destroyed on Judgement Day. The wall may have reflected a distant knowledge of the Great Wall of China (the 12th-century scholar al-Idrisi drew a map for Roger of Sicily showing the "Land of Gog and Magog" in Mongolia), or of various Sassanid Persian walls built in the Caspian area against the northern barbarians, or a conflation of the two.

Circumstances of revelation
Arab Muslim historian and hagiographer, Ibn Ishaq, reported in his traditional book (oral traditions) of biography of Muhammad, Sirat Rasul Allah that the 18th surah of the Qur'an (which includes the story of Dhu l-Qarnayn) was revealed to the Islamic prophet Muhammad by God on account of some questions posed by rabbis residing in the city of Medina – the verse was revealed during the Meccan period of Muhammad's life. According to Ibn Ishaq, Muhammad's tribe, the powerful Quraysh, were greatly concerned about their tribesman who had started claiming prophethood and wished to consult rabbis about the matter. The Quraysh sent two men to the rabbis of Medina, reasoning that they had superior knowledge of the scriptures and about the prophets of God. The two Quraysh men described their tribesman, Muhammad, to the rabbis.

The rabbis told the men to ask Muhammad three questions:

According to Ibn Ishaq, when Muhammad was informed of the three questions from the rabbis, he said that he would have the answers in the morning but did not say "if God wills it". For fifteen days, Muhammad waited eagerly for the revelation. Muhammad did not answer the question until then. Doubt in Muhammad began to grow amongst the people of Mecca. Then, after fifteen days, Muhammad received the revelation of al-Kahf as an answer to the questions.

Virtues
There is a hadith in Sahih Muslim that states that Muhammad said (Concerning The False Messiah, Al-Masih ad-Dajjal):

"Whoever reads Sura Kahf on Friday, light shall shine forth for him between the two Fridays."

Common Muslim and Christian theme
The story of believers falling asleep in a cave for a long time is present also in the Christian tradition, see Seven Sleepers.

See also
 Ashabi-Kahf in Nakhchivan  a sanctuary in a natural cave

Appendix

Notes

References

Bibliography

External links
Q18:51, 50+ translations, islamawakened.com

Quran 18 Clear Quran translation
Surah Kahf by Sudais
Surah Al Kahf

Kahf
Dhul-Qarnayn
Gog and Magog
Dogs in religion
Moses